The Devil's Hole is a Canadian documentary film, directed by Richard Lavoie and released in 1989. The film profiles the discovery of the largest cave in Eastern Canada, the Grotte de Boischatel at Boischatel, Quebec.

The film received a Genie Award nomination for Best Feature Length Documentary at the 11th Genie Awards in 1990.

References

External links
 

1989 films
1989 documentary films
Canadian documentary films
Films shot in Quebec
French-language Canadian films
1980s French-language films
1980s Canadian films